Lowrey may refer to:

People
Annie Lowrey (born 1984), American journalist
Bill G. Lowrey (1862–1947), U.S. Representative from Mississippi
Chris Lowrey (born 1986), New Zealand rugby union footballer
Eddie Lowrey (born 1891), Canadian professional ice hockey centre
Elizabeth Lowrey, American interior architect
Fred Lowrey (1902–1968), Canadian professional ice hockey defenceman
Gerry Lowrey (1906–1979), Canadian professional ice hockey forward
Grosvenor Lowrey (1831–1893), American lawyer
James Lowrey (1802–1875), American lawyer and politician
Janette Sebring Lowrey (1892–1986), American children's writer
Joe Lowrey (1879–1948), Australian rules footballer
Levi Lowrey, American singer-songwriter
Lloyd W. Lowrey (1903–1992), American politician
Mark Lowrey (cricketer) (born 1971), English cricketer
Mark Perrin Lowrey (1828–1885), Southern Baptist preacher and Confederate General in the U.S. Civil War
Pat Lowrey (born 1950), English footballer
Peanuts Lowrey (1917–1986), outfielder in Major League Baseball

Places
Lowrey, California, a community in the United States
Lowrey, Oklahoma, a community in the United States
Lynn R. Lowrey Arboretum, arboretum located across the campus of Rice University in Houston, Texas

Other uses
Carr Lowrey Glass Company (1889–2003), manufacturer of glass bottles
Lowrey organ, electronic organ named after Chicago industrialist Frederick Lowrey

See also
Lowry (disambiguation)